"My Life" is a song by Billy Joel that first appeared on his 1978 album 52nd Street. A single version was released in the fall of 1978 and reached No. 2 on the U.S. adult contemporary chart. Early the next year, it peaked at No. 3 on the Billboard Hot 100.

Musical structure 
The song begins with drums, electric bass, and a left-hand piano part, followed by a keyboard riff in the right hand. The riff is also used as a fill between verse and chorus sections and is also played at the end. The section order is intro-verse-fill-chorus-bridge-v-f-c-b-solo-c-outro.

Chicago members Peter Cetera and Donnie Dacus performed the backing vocals and sang along with Joel during the bridge and in the outro ("Keep it to yourself, it's my life").

"My Life" was used as the theme song for the ABC television series Bosom Buddies (1980–82), albeit in a re-recorded version with a different vocalist. However, due to licensing issues, it does not appear on the VHS and DVD releases of the series, nor is it used in the show's syndicated airings; in both cases, it is replaced by a vocal version of the show's closing instrumental theme, "Shake Me Loose", sung by Stephanie Mills.

The structure of the opening verse is essentially identical to the one in the song Sha-La-La-La-La, released five years prior by Danish glam rock band Walkers. Joel does not credit the band for inspiration.

Reception
Billboard described "My Life" as "an infectious uptempo tune guaranteeing a good mood for the listener."  Cash Box said that the "jumpy, upfront beat, keyboards, and acoustic guitar lines back Joel's strong singing" and praised the "musical and lyrical hooks." Record World called it a "Top 40 & adult [oriented rock] natural."

Personnel 
 Billy Joel – lead and backing vocals, Yamaha CP-70 electric grand piano, synthesizers
 David Brown – electric guitar
 Russell Javors – acoustic guitar
 Doug Stegmeyer – bass
 Liberty DeVitto – drums
 Richie Cannata – clarinet
 Peter Cetera – backing vocals
 Donnie Dacus – backing vocals

Charts

Weekly charts

Year-end charts

Certifications

References

External links
 

1978 singles
1979 singles
Billy Joel songs
Comedy television theme songs
Song recordings produced by Phil Ramone
Songs written by Billy Joel
Columbia Records singles
1978 songs
Number-one singles in Zimbabwe